David Bostice (born April 3, 1972, in Los Angeles, California) is an American retired heavyweight boxer.  Nicknamed "The Boss", Bostice is known for being a regular fighter on ESPN fight cards, and is a heavyweight clubfighter who fought several significant fighters of his era.

Professional career
Bostice turned pro in 1996 and was relegated to being a heavyweight journeyman after a loss to Wladimir Klitschko in 2000.  Bostice is often used as a gatekeeper used by aspiring contenders to enter the heavyweight rankings.

He has been beaten by Calvin Brock, Luan Krasniqi, Jeremy Williams, Lou Savarese, and most recently Alexander Povetkin.

Possibly Bostice's greatest claim to fame is his being featured as a boxer on the line up of EAs Knockout Kings 2001 for the PlayStation and PS2.

Professional boxing record

References

External links
 

1972 births
Living people
African-American boxers
Boxers from California
Heavyweight boxers
American male boxers
21st-century African-American sportspeople
20th-century African-American sportspeople